Doki-Doki is a Japanese short film that addresses the themes of isolation and disconnectness amidst the crowded subways cars of Japan. It was released in 2003 and directed by Chris Eska. Doki-Doki had its premiere U.S. broadcast on PBS's Independent Lens series on December 21, 2004 (introduction by Susan Sarandon).

Cast
Endo Yumi as Yumi
Hayato Sugano as Yosuke
Sae Takenaka as Makiko
Haruki Iwakiri as Narrator

Crew
Chris Eska, Director, Writer, Editor
Megumi Kano, Producer
Aya Mitsuhashi, Producer
Yasu Tanida, Director of Photography

External links
 Official Doki-Doki Website
 
  Doki-Doki on Independent Lens
 The Central Plaza - Behind the Scenes of Doki-Doki
 Review of Doki-Doki at eMovieCritic
 Doki-Doki at KCET'S 2003 Festival of Student Film

2003 films
2003 short films
Japanese short films
2000s Japanese films